George Neville Hudson (12 July 1905 – 24 November 1981) was an English cricketer. Hudson's batting style is unknown, though it is known he was a right-arm slow bowler.  He was born at Clitheroe, Lancashire.

Hudson made two first-class appearances for Lancashire in 1936, one in the County Championship against Derbyshire, and another against the touring Indians. His brief first-class career yielded a single run, and no wickets from 25 overs bowled. He later played club cricket for Bacup in the Lancashire League from 1946–48.

He died at Preston, Lancashire on 24 November 1981.

References

External links
George Hudson at ESPNcricinfo
George Hudson at CricketArchive

1905 births
1981 deaths
People from Clitheroe
English cricketers
Lancashire cricketers